Iowa Highway 8 is a state highway that runs from east to west in east central Iowa. Iowa 8 begins at an intersection with U.S. Highway 63 in Traer and ends at an intersection with U.S. Highway 218 northwest of Garrison. The route has largely remained the same since its designation.

Route description
Iowa 8 begins in downtown Traer at an intersection with US 63.  As it exits the small community, it turns to the southeast and then again to the east, forming a long S curve.  Through Tama County, the highway travels over a plain with farmland on either side of the road.   west of Dysart, the road is intersected by Iowa 21, which joins Iowa 8 from the north.  For the next , the two highways run together until they reach the eastern limits of Dysart, which is also the Tama–Benton county line.  Now in Benton County, the Iowa 8 continues due east.  The final  of the route are much hillier than the preceding .   The highway ends at the midpoint of a 90-degree turn along US 218 northwest of Garrison.

History
Prior to becoming a primary highway, Iowa 8's route was a part of the Diagonal Trail, which connected Sioux Falls, South Dakota, and Danville, Illinois.  Through Iowa, it passed through Davenport, Cedar Rapids, Iowa Falls, Spencer, and Spirit Lake.  The Diagonal Trail was registered with the Iowa State Highway Commission on December 4, 1918.  When the primary highway system was created, a portion of the Diagonal Trail was assigned Primary Road No. 58.  This portion of Primary Road No. 58 (which was truncated) was renumbered Iowa 8 in the 1926 Iowa highway renumbering. Since its designation, the route mostly has remained unchanged.  Two sharp curves east of Traer were eliminated for a straighter route with one more-gradual curve.

Major intersections

References

008